India competed at the 1980 Summer Olympics in Moscow, USSR.

Competitors

Medalists

Field Hockey
Vasudevan Baskaran (captain), Allan Schofield, Bir Bhadur Chettri, Sylvanus Dung Dung, Davinder Singh, Gurmail Singh, Ravinder Pal Singh, Sommayya Maneypande, Maharaj Krishan Kaushik, Charanjit Kumar, Merwyn Fernandes, Amarjit Singh Rana, Mohamed Shahid, Zafar Iqbal, and Surinder Singh Sodhi — Field Hockey, Men's Team Competition.

Results by event

Athletics
Men's 200 metres
 Subramanian Perumal
 Heat — 22.39 (→ did not advance)

Men's 800 metres
 Sriram Singh 
 Heat — 1:49.8
 Semifinals — 1:49.0 (→ did not advance)

Men's 1,500 metres
Sant Kumar
 Heat — 3:55.6 (→ did not advance)

Men's 10,000 metres
Hari Chand
 Heat — 29:45.8 (→ did not advance)

Men's Marathon
 Hari Chand
 Final — 2:22:08 (→ 31st place)

 Shivnath Singh
 Final — did not finish (→ no ranking)

Men's Shot Put
 Bahadur Singh Chauhan
 Qualification — 17.05 m (→ did not advance, 15th place)

Men's 20 km Walk
 Ranjit Singh
 Final — 1:38:27.2 (→ 18th place)

Women's 100 metres
 P. T. Usha
 Heat — 12.27 (→ did not advance)

Women's 800 metres
 Geeta Zutshi
 Heat — 2:06.6 (→ did not advance)

Women's 1,500 metres
 Geeta Zutshi
 Heat — did not start (→ did not advance)

Basketball

Men's Team Competition
Preliminary Round (Group A)
 Lost to Soviet Union (65-121)
 Lost to Czechoslovakia (65-133)
 Lost to Brazil (64-137)
Semi Final Round (Group B)
 Lost to Poland (67-113)
 Lost to Senegal (59-81)
 Lost to Sweden (63-119)
 Lost to Australia (75-93) → 12th place
Team Roster:
 Parvez Irani Diniar
 Chopra Ajmer Singh
 Tarlok Sandhu Singh
 Paramdip Singh
 Shyam Radhey
 Baldev Singh
 Dilip Gurumurthy 
 Paramjit Singh
 Nagarajan Amarnath 
 Jorawar Singh
 Rathore Uman Singh
 Harbhajan Singh

Boxing
Men's Light Flyweight (48 kg)
Thapa Birender Singh
 First Round — Lost to Dietmar Geilich (East Germany) on points (2-3)

Men's Flyweight (51 kg)
Amala Dass
 First Round — Lost to Yo Ryon-Sik (North Korea) on points (0-5)

Men's Bantamweight (54 kg)
Ganapathy Manoharan
 First Round — Bye
 Second Round — Defeated Samba Jacob Diallo (Guinea) on points (4-1) 
 Third Round — Lost to Geraldi Issaick (Tanzania) after referee stopped contest in second round

Hockey

Men's Team Competition
Preliminary Round
 India defeated Tanzania 18-0
 India drew Poland 2-2
 India drew Spain 2-2
 India defeated Cuba 13-0
 India defeated Soviet Union 4-2
Final
 India defeated Spain 4-3 →  Gold Medal

Women's Team Competition
Preliminary Round Robin
 Defeated Austria (2-0) 
 Defeated Poland (4-0)
 Lost to Czechoslovakia (1-2)
 Drew with Zimbabwe (1-1)
 Lost to Soviet Union (1-3) → 4th place
Team Roster:
 Margaret Toscano
 Sudha Chaudhry
 Gangotri Bhandari
 Rekha Mundphan
 Rup Kumari Saini
 Varsha Soni
 Eliza Nelson
 Prem Maya Sonir
 Nazleen Madraswalla
 Selma d'Silva
 Lorraine Fernandes
 Harpreet Gill
 Balwinder Kaur Bhatia
 Geeta Sareen
 Nisha Sharma
 Hutoxi Bagli

References

Nations at the 1980 Summer Olympics
1980 Summer Olympics